David E. Reed (1927–1990), was a Reader's Digest roving editor.

Career
He was born in Chicago, Illinois. He graduated from the University of Chicago at age 18 and began his journalism career with the Chicago City News Service. He later joined the Chicago Daily News.

Reed was a roving editor with Reader's Digest who reported from more than 100 countries and covered more than a dozen wars, including wars in Vietnam, Angola, Nicaragua, Cambodia, and many conflicts elsewhere in the world.  Reed learned Swahili during a two-year fellowship from the Institute of Current World Affairs to Kenya during the Mau Mau insurgency in the 1950s. In the late 1950s, he was a reporter for the U.S. News & World Report. He joined the Reader's Digest in  the early 1960s and worked there for the remainder of his lifetime. He interviewed several United States presidents, including then president Richard Nixon at the White House in 1971: .  He was the author of 111 Days in Stanleyville, Harper & Row, NY, 1965 and Up Front in Vietnam, Funk & Wagnalls, NY, 1967. 111 Days in Stanleyville was reprinted as Save The Hostages, Bantam Books, NY, 1988.

Reed wrote 111 Days in Stanleyville after spending more than four years in Africa during seven trips there on writing assignments. He took a two-month overland trip across the continent, and climbed Mount Kilimanjaro. In 1960 he covered the independence push in Congo as a staff writer for the U.S. News & World Report magazine.

Reed wrote Up Front in Vietnam after spending months in Vietnam during the Vietnam War. He travelled across Vietnam, criss-crossing back and forth in C-130 cargo planes, helicopters, trucks and jeeps. In the book, Reed wrote a series of sketches about what it was like to be up front with the soldiers in the combat zone in Vietnam.

In 1988, Reed received the Republic of China's International Communications Service award.

Reed was inducted into the Chicago Journalism Hall of Fame posthumously in 1992.

Selection of Reader's Digest articles by David E. Reed
North America
Sunken Treasure!, 12/1990
Don Williams, An American Worker’s Comeback, 04/1986
Chicago, Rowdy Crossroads of America, 1986: Int’l
Robots March on U.S; Industry, 04/1985
Of Tender Heart and Generous Spirit," 03/1985
Carlos Perez: "Hero of the ‘80’s," 09/1984
The Yukon: River of the Midnight Sun, 07/1984
Detroit Faces the Rising Sun: A New Day Dawns for the Motor City, 09/1983
Jeane Kirkpatrick: America’s "Undiplomatic" Ambassador, 08/1982
Search for the Missing Tomcat, 03/1977
The Ohio Valley—America’s Newest Industrial Empire, 12/1963

Latin America
"Good Morning, Cuba", 10/1988
High Stakes in Nicaragua, 09/1987
Can This Man Save the Panama Canal?, 01/1987
El Salvador: Back from the Brink, 05/1985
High Stakes in Central America, 08/1983
Central America’s Beacon of Hope, 12/1981
Haiti: A Nation in Agony, 10/1981
Communism’s Bold Grab for Central America, 12/1980
Argentina’s Appalling Reign of Terror, 06/1980
The Man Who Defied Castro, 04/1980
Nicaragua’s Somoza: Dictator at Bay, 01/1979
Should We Give Up the Panama Canal? 05/1976
The Legendary Career of Juan Peron, 1975: Int’l
Palenque: Mexico’s Mysterious Lost City, 1974: Int’l
The Night Managua Died, 05/1973
Taps for Tupamaros, 11/1972
The Last Days of Che Guevara, 04/1968
Colossus of Rivers: The Amazon, 09/1963
Cuba Revisited, 03/1961

Asia
The Search for Billy, Continued, 02/1990
South Korea: Going for the Gold, 09/1988
Murder at 37,000 Feet, 05/1988
Kidnapped by a Beloved Leader Comrade, 03/1987
Asia’s Four Little Dragons, 09/1986
Search for Billy, 06/1986
Exclusive Interview with President Chiang Ching-Kuo, 1986: Int’l
North Korea’s Secret Invasion Tunnels, 03/1980
Singapore: Jewel of Prosperity, 11/1979
The Realities of Recognizing China: An Editorial, 02/1979
South Korea and Its Strongmen, 09/1978
Singapore: Asia’s Big New Success Story, 1978: Int’l
Mission: Mine Haiphong!, 02/1973
The Agony of East Pakistan, by D. Reed & John E. Franzier, 11/1971
Russia Turns it Wheels, 09/1970
Vietnamization: Can it Succeed?, 04/1970
Countdown on Okinawa, 11/1969
Ordeal at the Embassy, 09/1968
Korea: The War That Never Ends, by, 06/1968
Hill 488: A Fight to Remember, by, 05/1968
Stand Firm in Vietnam!, 01/1968
Up Front in Vietnam, 09/1967
Our "Limited" War in the South China Sea, 04/1967
Tunku Abdul Rahman’s Malaysian Miracle, 02/1967
How Firmness in Vietnam is Paying Off, 04/1966
The Man for the Job in Vietnam, by D. Reed & John G. Hubbell, 01/1966
We Must Stop Red China—Now!, 02/1965

Africa
Can Mandela and de Kerk Save South Africa?, 09/1990
Do South African Sanctions Make Sense?, 02/1989
South Africa, Glimmers of Hope?, 08/1987
Can this Man Save Africa?: 05/1987
South Africa: Will White Rule End?, 02/1986
South Africa’s Champion of Nonviolence, 01/1983
Africa’s Wildlife: Countdown to Zero, 07/1982
Russia’s Ruthless Reach into Africa: 11/1977
Time Runs Out for South Africa, 02/1977
The Lingering Tragedy of Ethiopia, 09/1976
Angola’s Made in Moscow War, 06/1976
The Rocky Road to Freedom, 01/1973
The Tyrant Everybody Cultivates, 08/1972
Comeback in the Congo, 04/1971
A Nation is Dying!, 03/1969
White vs. Black in Rhodesia, 10/1966
Ghana: Communism’s Major Defeat in Africa, 06/1966
The Stanleyville Massacre, 09/1965
Rhino!, 07/1965
Ivory Coast—Africa’s Big Success Story, 01/1965
Express to the Mountains of the Moon, 09/1964
Ghana: Communism’s New Foothold In Africa, 07/1964
The Battle Against Sleeping Sickness, 07/1963
Nigeria: Black Africa’s Brightest Hope, 03/1963
Zanzibar: Laziest Place on Earth, 11/1962
Africa’s River of Mystery, 09/1962
Jomo Kenyatta: Africa’s Man of Mystery, 12/1961

Middle East
Should We Trust Yasir Arafat?, 09/1989
Turmoil in the Holy Land, 11/1988
The Unholy War Between Iran and Iraq, 08/1984
Bethlehem’s Man in the Middle, 02/1984
Jordan’s Indestructible King Hussein, 08/1981
Qaddafi, Libya’s Lord of Terror, 06/1981
Russia’s Real Target: The Middle East Oil Fields, 07/1980
Israel’s Menachem Begin; Key to Middle East Peace, 04/1978
The Arch-Terrorist Who Went Scot-Free, 09/1977
Syria’s Assad: Pivotal New Force in the Middle East, 08/1976
Jerusalem—Too Holy for its Own Good, 03/1975
The Man Who Changed Middle Eastern History, 06/1974
Qaddafi of Libya: The Big Question Mark in Oil, 11/1973
Golda Meir: Israel’s Tough Grandmother-Prime Minister, 07/1971
The Fedayeen—Israel’s Fanatic Foe, 10/1970
Bourguiba: Wise Voice in the Arab World, 06/1969

Europe
Maggie Thatcher: "She’s All Backbone," 11/1987
Terror in Northern Ireland: The American Connection, 04/1983
Northern Ireland’s Agony Without End, 01/1982
East Germany’s Sister Superspook, 12/1980
First and Last of the Sports Cars, 1980: Int’l
The Professionals—Britain’s New Army, 1980: Int’l
What End to Ulster’s Agony, 1979: Int’l
A King’s Struggle for Democracy, 05/1979
The Man Who Restored Democracy to Greece, 05/1978
Britain Defends the Admiral’s Cup, 1977:Int’l
East Germany: People for Sale, 10/1976
Cyprus: Tiny Island, Big Uproar, 12/1975
What’s Happening to Portugal? 10/1975
Northern Ireland—the Endless War, 07/1975
Front Line Ulster, 1975: Int’l
Finland and Its View of the World, 1975: Int’l
Spain After Franco—What Will Happen?, 01/1975
East Germany Comes in From the Cold, 03/1974
Yugoslavia: Time Bomb in Europe, 04/1973
Greece: Outcast of Europe, 07/1972
Northern Ireland’s Bloody Impasse, 01/1972

Early life and family
David Reed, son of Frank and Helen Reed, was born in 1927 and grew up in Chicago, Illinois. His father was a successful Chicago real estate broker. His grandfather, Thomas A. Reed, had migrated to Chicago from central Pennsylvania and worked at the 1893 World’s Columbian Exposition, also known as the "Chicago World’s Fair." He started a successful plastering and construction company at the Chicago World's Fair, now known as the Reed Illinois Corporation,  which still exists in Chicago to the present day.

One of Reed’s 2nd great grandfathers: James Pettit (1777–1849), and his son Eber M. Pettit (1802–1885), operated a station on the Underground Railroad in New York state to assist escaping slaves from the South.  Eber M. Pettit wrote "Sketches in the History of the Underground Railroad," in 1879, which was reprinted in 1999.  Jonathan Pettit (1752–1833), Reed's 3rd great-grandfather, served as a captain in the American Revolution in New York state. Reed was also related to the Adams presidential family.

David Reed was married to Marilyn "Mari" Chevalier, then of New York City, from 1961–1977, and had three children. He was married to Audrey Hamilton of Johannesburg, South Africa in the late 1970s.  He married Irene Whitaker, then of Maryland, in 1988.

David Reed was an avid sailor. At different times while travelling the globe, he was based in New York, Connecticut, Florida, Maryland, and Virginia.

References
The Washington Post, Obituary, 11/26/1990
The Washington Times, Obituary, 11/27/1990
The Chicago Tribune, Obituary, 12/2/1990
The Chicago Sun-Times, Obituary, 12/1/1990
Historical Dictionary of War Journalism, by Mitchel P. Roth, Greenwood Press, Westport, CT, 1997, p. 250
Institute of Current World Affairs, selection of articles by David E. Reed: 
111 Days in Stanleyville: ASIN: B0007E619I
 Historical audio tape of radio interview: "How the Church is Surviving the Congo Crisis" about 111 Days in Stanleyville, 12/13/1965, Night Call Studio at WKNR - Dearborn, Michigan, General Commission on Archives & History, United Methodist Church,  
References to 111 Days in Stanleyville in  "Dragon Operations: Hostage Rescues in the Congo, 1964-65," by Major Thomas P. Odom, Command and General Staff College, Combined Arms Research Library: 
"Congo Tragedy Symbolizes Whites' Failure in Africa," by Dan Kurzman, The Washington Post,  Jan. 6, 1966, Proquest Historical Newspapers, The Washington Post, pg A19.
Up Front in Vietnam: ASIN: B0007E0P3G
The Virtual Vietnam Archive: Up Front in Vietnam by David Reed. US Elite Forces - Vietnam US Infantry-Vietnam Valley of Peril by Alex McColl Valley of the Mekong by Matt J. Menger: 
Save the Hostages: , 

1927 births
1990 deaths
Writers from Chicago
University of Chicago alumni
American male journalists
20th-century American journalists
20th-century American non-fiction writers
20th-century American male writers